Rod Owen-Jones (born 6 January 1970) is an Australian water polo player who competed in the 2000 Summer Olympics.

Rod began his career playing in South Australia as a center-forward but switched to a utility player during his national team duties.

Rod played with the Australia men's national water polo team from 1991–2000. Rod represented the national team in the 1993 FINA Water Polo World Cup winning a Bronze Medal, Australia's best men's result at a major championship. He represented Australia at 3 Universiades, 2 World Championships, 2 World Cups and an Olympic Games.

Rod was the highest goal scorer at the 1993 and 1994 National Championships and voted as the Best and Fairest men's player in 1994.

References

External links
 

1970 births
Living people
Australian male water polo players
Olympic water polo players of Australia
Water polo players at the 2000 Summer Olympics
People educated at St Peter's College, Adelaide